SoBe (stylized as ) is an American brand of teas, fruit-juice blends and enhanced water beverages owned by PepsiCo. The name SoBe is an abbreviation of South Beach, named after the upscale area located in Miami Beach, Florida. In the past, the SoBe name has also been licensed for gum and chocolate products. SoBe switched from glass bottles to plastic bottles for all of its beverages in 2010.

Company history
SoBe began as the South Beach Beverage Company, a drink manufacturer based in Norwalk, Connecticut from 1996 to 2001. It was founded by Kevin McGovern, and co-founded by John Bello and Tom Schwalm in 1995. Their first product was SoBe Black Tea 3G which contained ginseng, guarana, and ginkgo. It proved to be popular and led to the introduction of other flavors. The company was bought by PepsiCo in October 2000.

Products

 SoBe Lifewater / SoBe Water - A vitamin-infused beverage. Most of the flavors are non-caloric and use steviol glycosides for natural sweetening.
 SoBe Elixirs - A line of fully sweetened (with sucrose and in some cases a mix of sucrose and Stevia) beverages with herbal extracts and some vitamins.
 SoBe Tea - A line of iced tea beverages with herbal extracts.
 SoBe Pure Rush - A line of energy drinks, no longer available in the United States.

Discontinued products
 SoBe Qi
 SoBe Adrenaline Rush
 SoBe No Fear
 SoBe Elixirs 3C
 SoBe Eros
 Power Line
 SoBe Synergy
 SoBe Nirvana
 SoBe Special Recipes
 SoBe Essential Energy
 SoBe Ice
 SoBe Zen Blend
 Sobe Wisdom
 SoBe SuperMan
 SoBe Good
 SoBe Dragon
 SoBe Love Bus Brew
 SoBe Oolong tea
 SoBe Lizard Lava
 SoBe Lizard Fuel
 SoBe Lizard Lighting
 SoBe Black and Blue Berry Brew
 SoBe Long John Lizard's Grape Grog

SoBe Mr. Green

Mr. Green was a short-lived carbonated soda offered by SoBe, widely released in the United States.  Shipping in April 2002 and first available to consumers in May, it was produced in 12 oz cans, 20 oz bottles, and 1- and 2-liter bottles.  It was a rare carbonated beverage offered by SoBe.

The soda's mascot of the same name was described as a "cyber lizard" in SoBe's press release.  This character was a modernized version of the lizard found on other SoBe products.

Mr. Green was tinted green, and included ginseng for flavor and added energy.

Marketing campaigns
 Lizard Tales is a monthly digital newsletter published by SoBe for their fans.  The newsletter provides consumers with product updates, promotions and cultural trends.
 In 2003, SoBe launched Adrenaline Rush which was marketed toward action sports.
 Heads or Tails was the name of the SoBe under-the-cap promotion where consumers could instantly win prizes, including SoBe apparel, Apple iPods, Apple MacBook Pros, or product coupons for future purchases.
 The 2001 game Oddworld: Munch's Oddysee features vending machines in the game that dispense SoBe drinks. This was only available in the North American version of the game.
 The 2004 game Driv3r also features vending machines (which don't work), along with bus ads and a SoBe themed truck in game.
 Starting in 2007, SoBe sponsored the Chicago Rush cheerleaders of the Arena Football League. The Rush dance team was called the SoBe Adrenalin Rush Dancers.
 In 2008 & 2009, SoBe had Super Bowl ads in support of SoBe Lifewater.
 In 2010, SoBe Lifewater partnered with AOL FanHouse to bring college basketball fans a bracket challenge where they could play their bracket against the brackets of celebrities, including Kendra Wilkinson, Brooklyn Decker, Jerry Rice and Kenny "The Jet" Smith. Those fans whose bracket beat a celebrity bracket had a chance to meet them. If a fan had a perfect bracket, they could win up to $10,000,000.
From 2010 to 2012, SoBe Lifewater partnered annually with actresses for their 'Skinsuits' campaign, Starting with Ashley Greene in 2010, Jessica Szohr in 2011, and ending the campaign in 2012 with Yvonne Strahovski
 In 2011, Ellie Goulding was announced as the UK face of SoBe. As part of the campaign she spent time in South Beach, Miami interviewing locals and traveling to South Beach hot-spots.
 In July 2011 SoBe partnered with Mike Tyson: Main Event in launching a mobile gaming campaign for the brand's teas, fruit juice blends, and enhanced waters.
 In Employee of the Month (2006 film), Vince Downey (played by Dax Shepard) drinks Sobe Nirvana with a Gatorade twist cap.

References

External links
 

 Sobe Mr. Green Soda overview on BevNet 

PepsiCo brands
Juice brands
Tea brands in the United States
Companies based in New York (state)
Companies based in Norwalk, Connecticut
Food and drink companies established in 1996
1990s fads and trends
2000s fads and trends
1996 establishments in Connecticut
2000 mergers and acquisitions